Byron "Snake" Jones is a retired American basketball player. Born in North Carolina, he played for the University of San Francisco. He was selected by the Boston Celtics in the 5th round (86th pick overall) of the 1973 NBA Draft.

Background
Nicknamed "the Snake", Jones grew up in North Carolina and played basketball at a Selma, Alabama junior college before enrolling at the University of San Francisco. He tried out for the Boston Celtics for two straight years after being chosen in the NBA draft. The Celtics sent him to Israel for experience with a pro team, the Sabras, coached by Herb Brown, who went on to become the Detroit Pistons mentor. Jones later signed up with a California semi-pro club, the San Jose Winchesters.

PBA career
In 1975, Jones made his way to the Philippines playing for the Toyota Comets in the Philippine Basketball Association (PBA). Jones averaged 16.9 points in his first season with Toyota, he completed his second campaign for the Comets in 1976, averaging 19.7 points.

He went on to play for the U/Tex Wranglers (1977-1978), Honda (1980) and the Crispa Redmanizers (1980-1981). At U/Tex, Jones averaged 28.04 points per game, a big jump from his previous average with Toyota. The next season, Jones found himself a member of a PBA champion team once more, teaming up with Glenn McDonald to pace the Wranglers to their first-ever PBA title. After his Honda stint in the first conference of 1980, Jones was signed up by Crispa as Sylvester Cuyler's partner for the Invitational championship. He played 10 games with the Jeans Makers and averaged 21.40 points per game. The "Snake" would play his final PBA season with Crispa the following year.

References

External links
1972 WCC Basketball champions

Living people
American expatriate basketball people in the Philippines
Basketball players from North Carolina
Boston Celtics draft picks
Forwards (basketball)
Junior college men's basketball players in the United States
Philippine Basketball Association imports
Toyota Super Corollas players
U/Tex Wranglers players
Crispa Redmanizers players
San Francisco Dons men's basketball players
American men's basketball players
Year of birth missing (living people)